In additive number theory and combinatorics, a restricted sumset has the form 

If  is a constant non-zero function, for example  for any , then  is the usual sumset  which is denoted by  if 

When 

Note that |S| > 0 if and only if there exist  with

Cauchy–Davenport theorem 
The Cauchy–Davenport theorem, named after Augustin Louis Cauchy and Harold Davenport, asserts that for any prime p and nonempty subsets A and B of the prime order cyclic group  we have the inequality

where , i.e. we're using modular arithmetic.

We may use this to deduce the Erdős–Ginzburg–Ziv theorem: given any sequence of 2n−1 elements in the cyclic group , there are n elements that sum to zero modulo n.  (Here n does not need to be prime.)

Kneser's theorem generalises this to general abelian groups.

Erdős–Heilbronn conjecture 
The Erdős–Heilbronn conjecture posed by Paul Erdős and Hans Heilbronn in 1964 states that  if p is a prime and A is a nonempty subset of the field Z/pZ.  This was first confirmed by J. A. Dias da Silva and Y. O. Hamidoune in 1994
who showed that 

where A is a finite nonempty subset of a field F, and p(F) is a prime p if F is of characteristic p, and p(F) = ∞ if F is of characteristic 0. Various extensions of this result were given by Noga Alon, M. B. Nathanson and I. Ruzsa in 1996, Q. H. Hou and Zhi-Wei Sun in 2002,
and G. Karolyi in 2004.

Combinatorial Nullstellensatz 
A powerful tool in the study of lower bounds for cardinalities of various restricted sumsets is the following fundamental principle: the combinatorial Nullstellensatz. Let  be a polynomial over a field .

The method using the combinatorial Nullstellensatz is also called the polynomial method. This tool was rooted in a paper of N. Alon and M. Tarsi in 1989, 
and developed by Alon, Nathanson and Ruzsa in 1995–1996, 
and reformulated by Alon in 1999.

See also 
Polynomial method in combinatorics

References

External links 

Augustin-Louis Cauchy
Sumsets
Additive combinatorics
Additive number theory